The 1900 Kentucky State College Blue and White football team represented Kentucky State College—now known as the University of Kentucky—as a member of the Southern Intercollegiate Athletic Association (SIAA) during the 1900 college football season. Led by first-year head coach William H. Kiler, the Blue and White compiled an overall record of 4–6 with a mark of 0–2 in SIAA play

Schedule

References

Kentucky State College
Kentucky Wildcats football seasons
Kentucky State College Blue and White football